The Kentucky Wildcats baseball team represents the University of Kentucky in NCAA Division I college baseball and competes in the Eastern division of the Southeastern Conference (SEC). The current head coach of the Wildcats is Nick Mingione.

Kentucky is the only member of the 14-team SEC never to reach the College World Series. Arkansas and South Carolina, both of which joined the SEC in 1992, have made multiple trips to Omaha since coming aboard, with the Gamecocks claiming back-to-back championships in 2010 and 2011. In 2013, the newest members, Missouri and Texas A&M, both made appearances as members of other conferences.

History
The baseball program, partly hampered by being the northernmost school in the heavily warm-weather SEC (until Missouri's arrival in 2013), has historically achieved only modest success at best. Under longtime coach Keith Madison (1979–2003), the Wildcats had some good teams. However, due to playing in the same league as national powers Florida, LSU (which won five national championships under Skip Bertman from 1991 through 2000), Mississippi State, and South Carolina,  regular-season success was rarely rewarded with a postseason berth. In 28 years, Madison was only able to lead the Wildcats to two NCAA Tournaments, in 1988 and 1993. The Wildcats won their first three regional games in 1988 to move to within one win of the CWS, but lost twice in the championship round to 1987 national champion Stanford, which went on to successfully defend its title.

Wildcats baseball hit bottom at the turn of the 21st century, with only one winning season from 1997 through 2004, and five straight last-place finishes in the SEC East from 2001 through 2005. In 2003, after Madison's retirement, Kentucky hired Florida assistant John Cohen as head coach. Cohen was able to lead the Cats to a winning overall season in 2005, despite another SEC cellar finish.

Few could have expected the Cinderella season the Cats would have in 2006. They went from worst to first in the SEC, winning a regular-season conference title for the first time in three decades, and being ranked as high as fourth in the country by one major baseball poll during the season. However, the newly energized Kentucky baseball faithful saw the Cats crash out of the SEC tournament early and fail to make it out of the regionals of the NCAA tournament at home.

There were high hopes for the 2007 team and for the most part they delivered. They started the season 19–0 before falling to Arkansas. They then fell into a tailspin but rebounded at the end of the year to just miss the SEC playoffs after a Tennessee Volunteers win. They finished with a 37–19 record. Jason Kipnis, who was an outfielder for that team, is now a second baseman for the Cleveland Indians.

In 2008, Kentucky started off strong posting a 19–0 record and being ranked as high as #4 in the nation. The Wildcats rolled into conference play and began to struggle after being swept by eventual College World Series runner-up Georgia and College World Series participant LSU. The Wildcats finished the season strong and made it into the NCAA tournament. The Wildcats would end up losing to Arizona in the regional final in Ann Arbor, Michigan. The Wildcats finished the season with a 44–19 record, the most wins in school history. They finished 25th in the final ESPN/USA Today poll.

The Wildcats slumped back to the SEC's second division in 2009, though they finished two games over .500 overall. Cohen left for Mississippi State after the season, and pitching coach Gary Henderson was named his successor.

In 2012, Kentucky garnered its most successful season ever in program history. Henderson was voted SEC Coach of the Year by the league coaches. Henderson directed the Wildcats to a school-record 45-win season, with UK completing its best finishes in the SEC and NCAA Tournaments in school annals. The 2012 season also marked the first time that UK had ever been ranked No. 1. UK finished the season with a No. 11 ranking by Baseball America. UK also achieved a program record by winning seven of ten series in SEC play. UK also ran up a school-record 22-game winning streak, which is the second longest in SEC history.

Stadium
The Wildcats played their home games on campus at Cliff Hagan Stadium from 1969 through 2018.  On October 21, 2016, Kentucky announced plans to build a new stadium, with fixed seating for 2,400, additional grass berm seating for a permanent capacity of 4,000, and the capability to add temporary seating to raise capacity to as much as 7,000.  The new stadium, Kentucky Proud Park, opened on February 26, 2019 with a 7-3 win over Eastern Kentucky in front of 4,074 fans.

Head coaches

G.L. Byroade (1903)
A.A. Gordon (1904)
W.C. Kelly (1905)
H.E. Reed (1906)
F.C. Paullin (1907)
C.M. Leaphart (1908)
Frank Engel (1911–1913)
Alpha Brummage (1914–1915)
Bill Tuttle (1916)
J.B. Fledge (1917)
Andrew Gill (1920–1921)
Jim Park (1922)
C.E. Barger (1923–1924)
Fred J. Murphy (1925–1926)
John Devereauux (1927, 1929–1931)
Fred Major (1928)
Frank Moseley (1939–1941, 1946, 1948–1950)
Bill Black (1942)
Harry Lancaster (1947, 1951–1965)
Abe Shannon (1966–1969)
Dick Parsons (1970–1972)
Jordan "Tuffy" Horne (1973–1978)
Keith Madison (1979–2003)
John Cohen (2004–2008)
Gary Henderson (2009–2016)
Nick Mingione (2017– )

Former players

Jeff Abbott
Joe Blanton
Collin Cowgill
Scott Downs
Doug Flynn
Marv Foley
Andy Green
Rod Henderson
Sean Hjelle
Paul Kilgus
Jason Kipnis
Jim Leyritz
Larry Luebbers
Luke Maile
Alex Meyer

Cotton Nash
Jeff Parrett
James Paxton
Tristan Pompey
Frank Ramsey
AJ Reed
Chris Rusin
Jack Savage
Terry Shumpert
Ryan Strieby
Mark Thompson
William Van Landingham
Brandon Webb
Evan White

Player awards

National awards
Dick Howser Trophy

Golden Spikes Award 

Baseball America College Player of the Year Award
A. J. Reed (2014)
Collegiate Baseball Newspaper College Player of the Year Award
A. J. Reed (2014)
John Olerud Award
A. J. Reed (2014)

SEC Awards
Player of the Year Award
Ryan Strieby (2006)
A. J. Reed (2014)

All-Americans

The following is a list of Kentucky's All-Americans:

NCAA Tournament record

Wildcats in MLB
Several Wildcats players have gone on to play in Major League Baseball.

See also
 List of NCAA Division I baseball programs

References

External links